Sodium bicarbonate transporter-like protein 11 is a protein that in humans is encoded by the SLC4A11 gene.

See also
 Solute carrier family
 Congenital endothelial dystrophy type 2

References

Further reading

Solute carrier family